Pronsky District is an administrative and municipal district (raion), one of the twenty-five in Ryazan Oblast, Russia. It is located in the west of the oblast. Its administrative center is the urban locality (a work settlement) of Pronsk. Population: 31,393 (2010 Census);  The population of Pronsk accounts for 12.6% of the district's total population.

References

Notes

Sources

Districts of Ryazan Oblast